Raulín Marte Rodríguez (born June 16, 1971) is a bachata artist, one of the first major bachata artists to have international success and popularize this style of music in the Dominican Republic.

Biography

Rodríguez was born in Las Matas de Santa Cruz, Monte Cristi, related to the Zapata family of Monte Cristi, on the northwest coast of the Dominican Republic. He toured with Antony Santos as a guitar player at age fifteen, and then went on to form his own band.

He has many international hits, including the songs: Nereyda, Medicina de Amor, Soledad, and many more.  While traditional bachata songs were often risque and suggestive, Raulin Rodríguez's idealized romantic lyrics helped the style achieve general social acceptability and to receive radio play.

Career
He was very known and popular in the 1990s and most of the 2000s and was in the same category as Antony Santos and Luis Vargas.

Discography

Studio Albums 

Una Mujer Como Tú (1993)

Una Mujer Como Tú • Nunca Dejaré de Amarte • Fue Como el Viento • Canción del Corazón • Margarita
Que Dolor • Mi Morenita • Anoche • La Vieja • Por Esa Mujer • Si Te Vas Mi Hembra

Regresa Amor (1994)

Ay Dios • Regresa Amor • El Ñoño • Nereyda • Tragedia de Arsenio Díaz • Dile Que No • El Comelón • Solo Por Ella • Quiéreme • Los Gorditos

Medicina de Amor (1995)

Medicina de Amor • Amor de Lejos • Homenaje a Mamá • María Luisa • Niña Bonita • Mujer Infiel • Que Vuelva • La Morena • La Cura de Rosa • El Tiguerón

El Amor Da Vida (1996)

Dame Corazón • Amor de Mi Vida • Las Mujeres de Quisqueya • Amor Te Extraño • Homenaje a José Acosta • Si Supieras • No Creo en el Amor • El Amor Da Vida • Mujer Dame, Dame • Amor Eres el Camino • Te Amé Con el Alma • Saludos a Mis Amigos

 Me La Pusieron Dificil (Rompió Las Cadenas) (1996)

Me La Pusieron Dificil • Quiero Saber • Merengue a los Amigos • Muchacha Bonita • Vamos a Bailar y Gozar • Que Voy a Hacer • Su Novio Primero • Los Dos Amigos • Sin Ti Mi Amor • Sin Ti

Soledad (1997)

Hace Tiempo Que Dejé de Verla • Hoy Que Tú No Estás • La Loca • Soledad • El Amor Que Me Pediste • Quisiera Detener el Tiempo • No Puedo Vivir Sin Ella • Despedida • Ingrata Mujer • Los Perdidos

Corazón, Corazón (1998)

Morena Yo Soy Tu Marido • Me Siento Triste Hoy (Bachata version) • Navidad, Navidad • Corazón, Corazón • Y Lloraré • A Donde Vayas Te Seguiré • Dame Tu Querer • Yo Me Enamoré • Un Amor Que Se Va • Popurrí: Dos Amantes / Nunca Más Podré Olvidarte / Chiquitita

Sin Fortuna (1999)

Que Me la Devuelva • Me la pusieron dificil • Si Tú Te Vas • Caliéntalo • Cuando Se Habla de Amor • Si Algún Día la Ves • Sin Fortuna • Te Amo y Te Quiero Mi Amor • Martín • Me Siento Triste Hoy (Balada version) • Estoy Enamorado de Ti

Arráncame la Vida (2001)

Arráncame la Vida • Quiero Ser de Ti • Dos Mujeres Para Mí • Quisiera Ser la Cama • Y Volveré • Cómo Quisiera Olvidarte • Espérame • ¿Qué Será? • Mi Linda Paloma • La Castigadora • 

Derroche de Amor (2002)

Derroche de Sexo • Cuando Te Acuerdes de Mi • Me Pregunto Por Qué • Mi Gran Amor • Si Yo Pudiera • Popurrí: Olvido / Ahora Seremos Felices • Me Olvidé de Vivir • Ya No • No Quiero Hacerte Daño • Respeta Mi Dolor • BombaDímelo (2003)Buscaré Un Nuevo Amor (No Engañes Tu Corazón) (Original version) • Sólo Pienso En Ella • La Mujer Casada • Dios Mío Por Qué (Es Mejor) (Original version) • Te Recordaré • Que Te Pasa (Original version) • Dímelo • Quiero Dormir Cansado • Cariño Mío (Amor de Mi Vida) (Spanglish version)Si No Te Tengo (2004)Ay Hombre • Es Mejor • Y Ahora Te Vas • Si No Te Tengo • Hoy Quiero Escribir Una Canción • Nadie Más Que Tú • No Me Vuelvo an Enamorar • Te Quiero • Amor de Mi Vida • No Engañes Tu Corazón • Llora Mi Corazón • Que Te Pasa • Mi Tonto AmorPiel Sin Alma (2005)Piel Sin Alma • Solo Quiéreme • Después de Tanto Amor • Te Pierdo y Te Pienso • Por Gustarte • Por Tu Primer Beso • Mi Mejor Amiga • Ya Te Vas Amor • Mi Mejor Amiga • Los ResbalonesA Dónde Iré Sin Ti (2006)A Dónde Iré Sin Ti • Se Me Salen las Lágrimas • Te Olvidaré • La Última Carta • Lo Mejor Que Me Ha Pasado • Flor Pálida • Que Vuelva • Una Tercera Persona • Cómo Será Mañana • Buena Suerte • GuantanameraLa Carretera (2007)Culpable • Tengo Corazón • Qué Importa Si Tú Te Vas • Me Mata la Melancolía • Un Camino Lejos • Si Supieras • Por Dónde Comienza el Amor • Ropita Vieja • Por Qué Me Buscas • Adiós Hermano • Necesito Tus Besos • Si Yo SupieraParece Mentira (2008)No Se Vale • Parece Mentira • Me Sale del Alma • Castillo • No Cuentes Conmigo • Pobre Diablo • Mi Vida Háblame • Si Tú Volvieras • Solamente Tú • Voy a Morir de AmorLlámame (2010)Llámame • Ella • Maldita Soledad • A la Orilla del Mar • Paz En Este Amor (feat. Yulisa Rodríguez) • Juanita Morel • Besos Callejeros (feat. Yulisa Rodríguez) • La Niña Que Nunca Volvió • Dios Cambia el Mundo (feat. Nayelis)Escenas de Amor (2015) Hablamos En La Cama (2018) Live Albums En Vivo (2000) Live (2002) Vol. 2Que Me la Devuelva • Arráncame la Vida • Me la Pusieron Difícil • Espérame • La Despedida • Quisiera Ser la Cama • Quiero Ser de Ti • Dos Mujeres Para Mí • Dame Tu Querer • Me Siento Triste Hoy • Si Nuestro Amor Se Acaba • No Me Ames • La Castigadora • Navidad, Navidad

 Compilation Albums Grandes Exitos (2001) Todo Exitos (2004) Exitos De Raulín Rodríguez (2007) Mega MixHits (2011) Uniquehits (2014) 1 (2015)'''

Personal life

Rodríguez is married with four children.

References

20th-century Dominican Republic male singers
Dominican Republic people of Spanish descent
Bachata musicians
Latin music songwriters
1970 births
Living people
21st-century Dominican Republic male singers